Homolje is a small geographical region in east Serbia south of the Danube river. It is centered on the town of Žagubica, with smaller parts belonging to municipalities of Kučevo, Majdanpek and Petrovac. In the narrow sense, the term "Homolje" is applied only to the Homolje valley around Mlava river, but it is usually applied to the low Homolje mountains (940 m) north of the valley and Beljanica and Crni Vrh mountains at the south. It is sparsely populated, and renowned for its unspoiled nature.

The main river is the Mlava which receives nine tributaries from the right and six from the left. But there are numerous other karst springs, sinking rivers and rapids. There are four gorges in the area (Gornjak, Ribare, Osanica and Tisnica) and numerous, unexplored caves (Pogana Cave, Ledena Cave, Strogine Caves). The region is covered with thick forests and many sinkholes and pits.

Homolje is also known for its vivid folklore which includes abundant legends of vampires, dragons, fairies and bats.

Population 

Populated places in Homolje (2002 Census):

References

Sources

External links 

 Municipality of Žagubica
 Homolje on SerbiaTravel

Geographical regions of Serbia
Geography of Southern and Eastern Serbia